Andrew Onezia (born 2 November 1994) is a Seychelles football player who plays for Red Star FC. He was a squad member for the 2016 and 2017 COSAFA Cup.

References 

1994 births
Living people
Seychellois footballers
The Lions FC players
Northern Dynamo FC players
Red Star FC (Seychelles) players
Seychelles international footballers
Association football defenders